The Wolseley 160 hp was a British V-8, water-cooled aero engine that first ran in 1910, it was designed and built by Wolseley Motors. Its sole known use was in the ill-fated HMA No. 1 airship which broke in two while being removed from its shed on 24 September 1911.

Applications
HMA No. 1

Specifications (160 hp)

See also

References

Notes

Bibliography

 Lumsden, Alec. British Piston Engines and their Aircraft. Marlborough, Wiltshire: Airlife Publishing, 2003. .

External links
May 1911 Flight article

160
1910s aircraft piston engines
Airship engines